Elena Chernenko (born April 17, 1957 in Fokino village, Bryansk region, Russian Federation) is a Transnistrian politician who is the Minister of Economy of the Pridestrovian Moldavian Republic (PMR) (2000–2011). In the Ukraine-Transnistria border customs conflict she took one of the leading roles among the country's ministers.

She is a close ally of former Minister of Education Elena Bomeshko, another (former) female member of president Igor Smirnov's cabinet.

Biography
Elena Cernenko was born on April 17, 1957 in the village of Fokino in the Bryansk region (today in the Russian Federation), in a family of Russian nationality. Since 1975 she has worked as an accountant and then chief accountant at the Tiraspol Brick Factory. She graduated the National Economics Institute from Odessa in 1981, obtaining the qualification of an economist.

In 1986 she became the chief accountant at the "Moldavizolit" Plastic Products Factory in Tiraspol, then in 1989 she transferred herself as a director on economic problems at the Tiraspol Brick Factory. Since 1992 she has been working as Chief Accountant and Financial Director at the Tiraspol Mixed Italian-Transnistrian enterprise in Tiraspol, which manufactures synthetic footwear and molding machines.

In August 2000, Elena Cernenko was appointed as Economy Minister of the self-proclaimed Moldovan Dniester Republic, being reconfirmed in January 2007. In this, she is engaged in attracting foreign investments and the process of privatization of Transnistrian enterprises. She played an important role in resolving the customs conflict between Transnistria and Ukraine.

She is married and has two daughters.

External links 
 Ministry of Economy official website

Living people
1957 births
Transnistrian people of Russian descent
Women government ministers of Transnistria
Odesa National Economics University alumni